Schineriella is a genus of non-biting midges in the subfamily Tanypodinae of the bloodworm family Chironomidae.

Tanypodinae